The 20955/20956 Surat–Mahuva Superfast Express is a Superfast train of the Indian Railways connecting  in South Gujarat and  of Saurashtra. It is currently being operated with 20955/20956 train numbers on five days a week basis.

Service

The 20955/Surat–Mahuva Superfast Express has an average speed of 56 km/hr and covers 631 km in 11 hrs 10 mins.

The 20956/Mahuva–Surat Superfast Express has an average speed of 57 km/hr and covers 631 km in 11 hrs 05 mins.

Route and halts

Coach composition

The train consists of 17 coaches :

 1 AC III Tier
 8 Sleeper coaches
 6 General
 2 Seating cum Luggage Rake

Schedule

Traction

See also 

 Bandra Terminus–Mahuva Express
 Surat railway station
 Mahuva Junction railway station

Notes

External links 

 20955/Surat - Mahuva SF Express
 20956/Mahuva - Surat SF Express

References 

Transport in Surat
Transport in Bhavnagar
Rail transport in Gujarat
Express trains in India
Railway services introduced in 2021